Carl Moller may refer to:

Carl Møller (1887-?), Danish rower and Olympic gold medalist
Carl Möller (1857-1933), Swedish architect and public official
Carl Moller (musician) on List of Bad Taste artists